Panaji Assembly constituency is one of the 40 Legislative Assembly constituencies of Goa state in India.

It is part of North Goa district.

Members of Legislative Assembly

^ by-poll

Election results

2022

2019 by-election
A by-election was held on 19 May 2019, as a result of the demise of incumbent MLA and chief minister Manohar Parrikar.

2017 By Election

2017 result

2015 by-election

A by-election was necessitated following the resignation of incumbent MLA and Chief Minister Manohar Parrikar, due to his elevation as the Minister of Defence.

2012 result

2007 result

2002 result

See also
 List of constituencies of the Goa Legislative Assembly
 North Goa district

References

External link
  

North Goa district
Assembly constituencies of Goa
Panaji